Thioredoxin-like protein 4B is a protein that in humans is encoded by the TXNL4B gene.

Interactions 

TXNL4B has been shown to interact with PRPF6.

References

Further reading